Cămărașu is a commune in Cluj County, Transylvania, Romania. It is composed of three villages: Cămărașu, Năoiu (Novoly) and Sâmboleni (Mezőszombattelke).

Demographics 
According to the census in 2002, there was a population of 2,782, of whom 77.74% were ethnic Romanians, 15.09% ethnic Romani and 7.15% ethnic Hungarians.

Natives
 András Sütő (1927–2006), writer

References

Communes in Cluj County
Localities in Transylvania